B. andrewi  may refer to: 
 Brachypelma andrewi, a tarantula species of the genus Brachypelma

See also
 Andrewi (disambiguation)